US Post Office-Delhi is a historic post office building located at Delhi in Delaware County, New York, United States. It was built in 1938, and is one of a number of post offices in New York State designed by the Office of the Supervising Architect of the Treasury Department, Louis A. Simon.   It is a symmetrically massed one story brick building with a stone watertable in the Colonial Revival style. The front section features a copper clad gable roof crowned by a square flat-topped cupola with Doric order pilasters and round arched vent openings on each face. The interior features a 1940 mural by artist Mary Earley titled Down-Rent War, Around 1845.

It was listed on the National Register of Historic Places in 1988.

See also
National Register of Historic Places listings in Delaware County, New York

References

Delhi
National Register of Historic Places in Delaware County, New York
Government buildings completed in 1938
Colonial Revival architecture in New York (state)
Buildings and structures in Delaware County, New York